The Mediterranean sand smelt, Atherina hepsetus, is a species of fish in the family Atherinidae.

Description
The body is rather long, slender and moderately flattened. The mouth is protrusible, directed upward with small teeth; the head and body are scaly.

The lower jaw has an upper expansion within the mouth (high dentary bone).

Two separate dorsal fins, all rays of first and 1-2 anterior rays of second dorsal fin are unsegmented, with the remaining rays segmented.  The anal fin is similar to the second dorsal fin, while the caudal fin is forked. Body is silverish white, darker on the back, with the light blue horizontal stripe extending to the tail.

The maximum size is up to 20 cm in length.

Although rather small, as a carnivorous species, it feeds on pelagic copepods and benthic crustaceans.

In the Mediterranean, it spawns from December to May.

Habitat
It is a pelagic-neritic, brackishwater / marine fish, widespread in the eastern Atlantic coasts of Spain and Morocco including Madeira and the Canary Islands. It is also found in the western Mediterranean, Adriatic and Black Seas.

Fishing
The major small-scale fishing gears exploiting this species are the various coastal beach seines, small mesh size (10 mm) gill nets and lift-nets. 
Rarely it can be caught on very small hook, baited with small chunks of fish meat. Live Mediterranean sand smelt is excellent bait for many predatory species that feed on this gregarious fish.

Cuisine
The meat  is mostly deep fried with larger specimens sometimes prepared as part of mixed fish stew or soup.

References

 Review of Croatian selected scientific literature on species mostly exploited by the national small-scale fisheries PDF file on FAOAdriaMed.org

External links
 

Mediterranean sand smelt
Fish of the East Atlantic
Fish of the Mediterranean Sea
Fish of the Black Sea
Fauna of the Canary Islands
Mediterranean sand smelt
Taxa named by Carl Linnaeus
Taxobox binomials not recognized by IUCN